Phidiana bourailli is a species of sea slug, a nudibranch, a marine, gastropod mollusk in the family Facelinidae.

Distribution
This species was described from New Caledonia. It has been reported from Tanzania, Australia, the Marshall Islands and the Mariana Islands.

References

Facelinidae
Gastropods described in 1928